Monsures is a commune in the Somme department in Hauts-de-France in northern France.

Geography

Population

History
A fort existed here at the end of the 9th century. Originally known as Monsulae, in the 12th century, it belonged to the seigneurs of the nearby commune of Conty.

The Beauvais – Amiens railway line once passed through the commune. Used for freight and passengers from 1876 until 1939, but never reopened following World War II.

On 14 May 1923, a Farman F.60 Goliath of Air Union crashed at Monsures following structural failure of a wing in flight. All six people on board were killed.

Places of interest
 The château-fort entrance and its 15th-century towers, on the promontory at the west of the village.
 Church of Saint Leger, bishop of Autun (616–678). First documented in 1127. The present building dates form the end of the 15th century and is built of local stone. The tower underwent restoration in 1731 and the present bells were installed in 1821 and 1868.
 The old sacristy. On the south side of the church and along with the nearby presbytery, built in the second half of the 19th century. Since December 1998, it has housed the Mairie.
 The early 16th century chapel of Notre-Dame du Bon Secours at Estocq, a hamlet of the commune.  It originally belonged to the Thierry family, fiefs of  Argenlieu - an old commune now occupied by Monsures and by Rogy, to the edge of the commune of  Gouy-les-Groseillers. The stone quarried from the locality was used to build the old manor and the chapel at Estocq.
 The chapel of Notre-Dame des Victoires was built in 1858 by Charlemagne Boyeldieu, a descendant of General Louis-Léger Boyeldieu, who was born at Monsures in 1774. Since 2004, the chapel has housed the commune's multi-media library.
 The Coulée verte. A nature trail for hikers and riders, based on the route of the old railway, wends its way along the valley of the Selle river for about 20 miles, from Crèvecœur-le-Grand to Vers-sur-Selles.

Personalities
 Louis Léger Boyeldieu

See also
Communes of the Somme department

References

External links

 Monsures commune website 
 Le site de Stéphanie Collonvillé et Stéphane Lehodey, à Monsures 

Communes of Somme (department)